The 2017–18 CEV Cup was the 46th edition of the European CEV Cup volleyball club tournament.

Participating teams
The number of participants on the basis of ranking list for European Cup Competitions:

Main phase

32nd Finals

|}

First leg

|}

Second leg

|}

16th finals

|}

First leg

|}

Second leg

|}

8th finals

|}

First leg

|}

Second leg

|}

4th finals

|}

First leg

|}

Second leg

|}

Final phase

Semi finals

|}

First leg

|}

Second leg

|}

Final

First leg

|}

Second leg

|}

Final standing

References

External links
 Official site

CEV Cup
2017 in men's volleyball
2018 in men's volleyball